Martyn Chalk (born 30 August 1969) is an English former footballer who played in the Football League for Derby County, Stockport County and Wrexham.

References

English footballers
English Football League players
Derby County F.C. players
Stockport County F.C. players
Wrexham A.F.C. players
1969 births
Living people
Association football midfielders